Gheorghe Iamandi (born 7 April 1957) is a Romanian former football forward and manager. He was part of Dinamo București's team that reached the semi-finals in the 1983–84 European Cup season. After he ended his playing career, Iamandi worked as a manager at Delta Tulcea and as a police officer in Tulcea.

Honours
Dinamo București
Divizia A: 1983–84
Cupa României: 1983–84

References

1957 births
Living people
Romanian footballers
Association football forwards
Liga I players
Liga II players
FC Delta Dobrogea Tulcea players
FC Olt Scornicești players
FC Dinamo București players
FCM Târgoviște players
FCM Bacău players
FC Petrolul Ploiești players
Romanian football managers
Footballers from Bucharest